Emese (fl. 9th century CE) was the daughter of Prince Önedbelia of Dentumoger, the consort of the Scythian (i.e. from Dentumoger, Scythia) lord Ügyek, and the mother of High Prince Álmos in Hungarian historical mythology; thus, she was the ancestress of the Hungarian royal house of Árpád, the dynasty which founded the Hungarian Kingdom. Due to a lack of reliable source material, it is difficult to separate the legends concerning Emese from her actual role as an historical person.

Emese was a Hungarian woman who lived in an epoch when the Magyars' cohabitation with the Khazars ceased, and the Pechenegs forced them to resettle in the Carpathian basin, where they established their kingdom. According to tradition, she is the mother of the Magyar royal dynasty, which sprang from one of the seven original Magyar tribes. Hence, she  has been credited as "the mother of all ethnic Hungarians".

Emese in legend

Emese's Dream, the legend concerning the conception of Prince Álmos, is one of the earliest known tales from Hungarian history. The legend can be tentatively dated to around 860-870, and with certainty to between 820 and 997 (the birth of Álmos and the acceptance of Christianity).

In the legend, Emese, the wife of Chief Ögyek (Ügek), was impregnated by a turul bird. The turul appeared to her in a dream and told her that from her womb a great river would begin, and flow out over strange lands. According to dream interpreters, this meant that she would give birth to a son who would lead his people out of their home in Levedia, and that her descendants would be glorious kings. Emese's son was named Álmos; his name derives from the Hungarian word álom, meaning dream, thus "Álmos" can be interpreted as "the Dreamt One".

The legend has several variants, namely regarding whether Emese was impregnated by the turul bird or whether she was already pregnant at the time of her dream, and whether the bird appeared to her literally or in a dream while she was asleep. Some variations of the legend may have been introduced in the 19th century during the reemergence of Hungarian nationalism at that time.

Emese in written sources 
Emese is mentioned in two historical works: the Gesta Hungarorum and the Chronicon Pictum. Neither source is contemporary with Emese, as each was written centuries after her death (the Gesta around 1200 and the Chronicon Pictum in the 14th century). Both works freely intermingle actual historical events with legend and chivalric tales, so it is impossible to know if Emese is mentioned as legend or as an actual historical personage.

In the Gesta Hungarorum ("The Deeds of the Hungarians"), the anonymous author writes "In the year of the Lord 819 Ügek, noble Lord of Scythia descending from the great house of Magog, took in marriage the daughter of Eunedubelia of Dentumoger, Emesu. From her a son was born and given the name Almus. The child was given this divine name for when his mother was pregnant with him there appeared to her a in a dream a bird, and instantly it seemed to her that from her womb a spring began and from her loins spread a great line of kings but they did not propagate in their own lands."

The Chronicon Pictum contains the text "Eleud, the son of Ugek by the daughter of Eunodbilia in Scythia had a son, who was named Almus because in a dream of his mother there appeared a bird in the shape of a hawk who impregnated her, and from her womb a fast-flowing stream began to flow, but it was in foreign lands that it grew and propagated. So it happened that from her loins a great line of kings was born."

Name 
Emese is also a feminine Hungarian name. Its meaning is mother or breastfeeder. Emese means "little mother" in ancient Hungarian. It derives from "eme", mother, and the agglutinating "[s]e", which stands for "little". Its root is Finno-Ugric, c.f. Finnish emä, from Proto-Finnic *emä, from Proto-Uralic *emä, and Hungarian anya, from Proto-Uralic *ańa. Cognates of emä include Estonian ema, Northern Sami eapmi (“pistil”), and Nganasan немы (ńemy).

See also
Hungarian Prehistory
Hungarian mythology

Sources

 

Given names
Hungarian prehistory
House of Árpád
9th-century Hungarian people
9th-century Hungarian women